The Main Street Bridge, once known as the West Main Street Bridge, is a historic pony Pratt truss bridge crossing the South Branch Raritan River in Clinton of Hunterdon County, New Jersey. It was designed by Francis C. Lowthorp and built in 1870 by William Cowin of Lambertville. The bridge was added to the National Register of Historic Places on September 28, 1995 as part of the Clinton Historic District. It is one of the few early examples of iron Pratt truss bridges remaining in the United States. It was documented by the Historic American Engineering Record in 1991.

Description
The Main Street bridge is one of three remaining composite cast iron and wrought iron Pratt truss bridges built by Cowin in New Jersey. The others are the New Hampton Pony Pratt Truss Bridge (1868) in New Hampton and the Glen Gardner Pony Pratt Truss Bridge (1870) in Glen Gardner. It features Italianate style end posts and decorative cast-iron guard rails for the pedestrian walkways.

Gallery

See also
 National Register of Historic Places listings in Hunterdon County, New Jersey
 List of bridges documented by the Historic American Engineering Record in New Jersey
 List of bridges on the National Register of Historic Places in New Jersey
 List of crossings of the Raritan River

References

External links
 
 
 

Buildings and structures in Clinton, New Jersey
Bridges over the Raritan River
Historic American Engineering Record in New Jersey
Historic district contributing properties in New Jersey
Historic district contributing properties in Hunterdon County, New Jersey
National Register of Historic Places in Hunterdon County, New Jersey
Road bridges on the National Register of Historic Places in New Jersey
New Jersey Register of Historic Places
Pratt truss bridges in the United States
Bridges in Hunterdon County, New Jersey
Bridges completed in 1870
Iron bridges in the United States
1870 establishments in New Jersey